Bilan Osman (8 September 1992), is a Swedish-born Somali journalist whose focus is on combating racism in Sweden. She was given the ELSA Award in 2014, an annual award given out by the Swedish Committee Against Antisemitism for "individuals or groups who, via social media or in other ways, counteract anti-Semitism and other types of prejudice".

Osman was a columnist for Expressen and Svenska Dagbladet, and worked for Expo Magazine. She grew up in Linköping and Partille; her parents came from Somalia. She lives in Stockholm, and writes for Feministiskt Perspektiv. She was nominated in 2020 for the "Rising Star" award, sponsored by the Swedish Magazine Publishers Association.

References

External links
Osman on Twitter

Living people
1992 births
Swedish people of Somali descent
Swedish journalists
Swedish women journalists
People from Linköping
People from Partille Municipality
Swedish columnists
Swedish women columnists